Pam Roth is a former Republican member of the Illinois House of Representatives, representing the 75th district from 2011 until her resignation in August 2013.

References

External links

Illinois General Assembly - Representative Pam Roth (R) 75th District, official IL House website
Illinois House Republican Caucus - Pam Roth profile

Living people
Republican Party members of the Illinois House of Representatives
People from Washington, Iowa
Women state legislators in Illinois
Year of birth missing (living people)
People from Morris, Illinois
21st-century American women